Yao Hong's empress (actual name unknown) (died 417) was the wife of Yao Hong, the last emperor of the Qiang-led Later Qin dynasty of China. Very little is known about her other than her existence—not even her name—and the fact that she was his empress. When he surrendered to Jin Dynasty (266–420) after attacks by the Jin general Liu Yu, she was delivered to the Jin capital Jiankang with him, where he was executed. Presumably, she was executed as well, as Liu Yu executed nearly all of the ruling class of the Later Qin state.

References 
 Book of Jin, vol. 119.
 Zizhi Tongjian, vol. 118.

|- style="text-align: center;"

|-

|-

|-

Later Qin empresses
417 deaths
Year of birth unknown
Executed royalty